Kjell Thomas Johansson is a Swedish former footballer who played mainly as a forward for AIK Fotboll.

References

1961 births
Living people
Swedish footballers
Allsvenskan players
AIK Fotboll players
Väsby IK players
People from Paranaguá
Association football forwards